Lieutenant Honore Marie Joseph Leon Guillaume de Bonald (born 13 August 1894, date of death unknown) was a World War I flying ace credited with five aerial victories.

Biography

Honore Marie Joseph Leon Guillaume de Bonald was born on 13 October 1894 in Valady, France. He volunteered for four years in the French military on 23 October 1913. After being promoted to Maréchal des logis in the Hussars, he was sent to pilot's training on 16 September 1915. On 30 December 1915, he received his Military Pilot's Brevet. After advanced training, he was posted to Escadrille 69 on 6 April 1916. On 14 June, he was wounded seriously enough to be medically evacuated. When he had recovered, Escadrille 69 had been shifted to the Italian Front; he followed them there.

By war's end, he had been commissioned as lieutenant. He had shot down five enemy airplanes between 1 November 1916 and June 1917. He had also earned the honor of becoming a Chevalier in the Legion d'honneur. He also held the Croix de Guerre and the Italian Medal of Military Valor.

He was married to Henriette de Lastic-Vigouroux.

Honors and awards citations
Chevalier de la Légion d'Honneur

"Pilot of Escadrille N69; energetic and brave officer. Very seriously wounded in the cavalry, when his wounds healed he requested to serve in aviation. Since he arrived at his Escadrille he has shown himself to be a first class pursuit pilot. Has completed numerous hours of flight and has had many combats. He downed his fourth enemy plane on 3 June 1917. Already twice cited in orders."

Chevalier de la Légion d'Honneur citation, 15 June 1917.

Sources of information

References
 Franks, Norman; Bailey, Frank (1993). Over the Front: The Complete Record of the Fighter Aces and Units of the United States and French Air Services, 1914–1918 London, UK: Grub Street Publishing. .

1894 births
Year of death missing
French World War I flying aces